Spinola Palace, also known as Spinola House, is a palace in Valletta, Malta. It belonged to the Spinola family between the 17th and 18th centuries. One third of the building was demolished in the 20th century, but the remaining two wings still exist and are now used as the head office of Lombard Bank.

History
The palace originally belonged to Fra Giovanni de Villaroel, the Balì of Noveville. In 1660, the palace was transferred to Fra Paolo Raffaele Spinola, the Balì of Lombardy, who later built another Spinola Palace in St. Julian's. In the 1720s, the Italian artist Nicolau Nasoni painted frescoes on the palace's ceiling. The palace remained in the hands of the Spinola family until 1780. Architect Romano Fortunato Carapecchia have given the palace a baroque facelift, from an austere façade, in the eighteenth century.

The palace was divided into three parts in 1922. The wing facing St. Christopher Street was demolished to make way for apartments, while the other two wings were used as private houses or offices. Lombard Bank acquired the wing facing Republic Street in the 1970s, and converted it into their head office. The wing facing St. Frederick Street was also acquired by Lombard Bank in the 2000s. It has since been restored and renovated.

Further reading

 Paul Camilleri & Associates (2010), "Completed", Palazzo Spinola, pp. 8-11.
 Menqa-morphosis
 Focus Shifts to 2017, 2018
Frederick Street
Mysteries Of the Maltese ‘gallarija’ (2)

References

Palaces in Valletta
Buildings and structures in Valletta
Baroque palaces in Malta
Bank headquarters
Bank buildings
Headquarters in Malta
Spinola family
Office buildings in Malta